Twitchell (also spelled Twichell) is a surname, and may refer to:

 Chase Twichell, American poet
 Jenny Twitchell Kempton (1835–1921), American operatic contralto
 Rev. Dr. Joseph Twichell, New England reverend, friend of Mark Twain
 Karl Twitchell, American engineer and surveyor
 Kent Twitchell, American artist
 Mark Twitchell, Canadian filmmaker convicted of murder
 Marshall H. Twitchell, Louisiana state senator and carpetbagger during the Reconstruction Era in the United States
 Paul Twitchell, American religious leader
 Ralph Twitchell, American architect
 Wayne Twitchell, American baseball player

See also
 Twitchell Reservoir, in California
 Twitchell Creek, in New York
 Twitchell Lake (disambiguation)
 Twitchell Mountain, in New York
 Twitchett
 Twichell, a dialect term for an alley
 Commonwealth v. Twitchell